Praveen Kashyap (born 21 April 1953) is an Indian former cricketer. He played first-class cricket for Delhi and Railways between 1976 and 1982.

See also
 List of Delhi cricketers

References

External links
 

1953 births
Living people
Indian cricketers
Delhi cricketers
Railways cricketers
Place of birth missing (living people)